George Anderson (1819 – 4 November 1896) was a Liberal Party politician in the United Kingdom.

He was elected at the 1868 general election as one of the three Members of Parliament (MPs) for Glasgow, taking the extra seat created for the city by the Representation of the People (Scotland) Act 1868.

Anderson held the seat until he resigned in March 1885 by becoming Steward of the Manor of Northstead, to take up the post of Deputy Master of the Mint in Melbourne, Australia.

References

External links 

Members of the Parliament of the United Kingdom for Glasgow constituencies
1819 births
1896 deaths
Scottish Liberal Party MPs
UK MPs 1868–1874
UK MPs 1874–1880
UK MPs 1880–1885
British expatriates in Australia
Presidents of Co-operative Congress